IntoUniversity is a United Kingdom-based charity that aims to help disadvantaged young people gain a place within a higher education establishment. It provides encouragement to children and young people aged 7–18 in pursuing further education.

Locations 
IntoUniversity started off with a pilot centre at North Kensington in 2007, and now operates 31 centres and extension projects across the country. Within London there are 12 centres and regionally, IntoUniversity has centres in the Midlands, South West, North West and East Anglia.

IntoUniversity was selected by William and Catherine (then Catherine Middleton), prince and princess of Wales, as one of the charities to receive a gift fund from the royal wedding in April 2011.

Awards 
 Charity of the Year, Charity Times
 Centre for Social Justice Award
 London Education Partnership Awards, for "Building bridges: cross-organisational partnership and impact"

References

Further reading 
 Charity that makes university possible – The Guardian
 Unequal Britain: The future has already been decided for our children – The Times
 Christmas 2010 charity appeal – The Guardian
 Fees seem not to deter students – BBC; NFER study looks at IntoUniversity

External links
 Official website

Educational charities based in the United Kingdom